Lady Hong is a 1969 South Korean film directed by Kim Ki-young.

Plot
A man whose fiancée and her family have died, reluctantly marries another woman. When the ghost of his fiancée visits him, he is tempted to join her in matrimony.

Cast
 Lee Soon-jae
 Moon Hee
 Sa Mi-ja

Notes

Bibliography
 
 
 

1969 films
Films directed by Kim Ki-young
South Korean ghost films
1960s Korean-language films
South Korean horror films